Indian Henry's Patrol Cabin is an early National Park Service patrol cabin in Mount Rainier National Park. "Indian Henry" was an Indian guide who accompanied James Longmire in his explorations of the area. The Indian Henry's area became a tourist destination with the 1908 establishment of the "Wigwam Camp," a tent camp which was abandoned in 1918. The area remained as a headquarters for backcountry patrols; the cabin was the first such facility in the park.

The cabin is a one-story log structure with a broad front porch. It was placed on the National Register of Historic Places on March 13, 1991. It is part of the Mount Rainier National Historic Landmark District, which encompasses the entire park and which recognizes the park's inventory of Park Service-designed rustic architecture.

References

Park buildings and structures on the National Register of Historic Places in Washington (state)
Residential buildings completed in 1916
Buildings and structures in Pierce County, Washington
Ranger stations in Mount Rainier National Park
Log cabins in the United States
National Register of Historic Places in Mount Rainier National Park
Log buildings and structures on the National Register of Historic Places in Washington (state)
1916 establishments in Washington (state)